Podostena is a genus of May beetles and junebugs in the family Scarabaeidae. There are at least four described species in Podostena.

Species
These four species belong to the genus Podostena:
 Podostena bottimeri (Howden, 1958)
 Podostena litoralis Howden, 1997
 Podostena rileyi Howden, 1997
 Podostena sleeperi Howden, 1997

References

Further reading

 
 
 
 
 

Melolonthinae
Articles created by Qbugbot